Ciocăneşti may refer to several places in Romania:

 Ciocănești, Călărași, a commune
 Ciocănești, Dâmbovița, a commune
 Ciocănești, Suceava, a commune
 Ciocăneşti, a village in Călineşti, Argeş
 Ciocăneşti, a village in Cozieni, Buzău County
 Ciocăneşti, a village in Dioști, Dolj County
 Ciocăneşti, a village in Bărăști, Olt County